Things Are What They Used to Be is the third studio album by Zoot Woman. It was released through Zoot Woman Records in 2009.

Critical reception

Stéphane Girard of Resident Advisor gave the album a 3.5 out of 5, saying: "Predictable in many ways but still displaying a strong sense of self, Zoot Woman's Things Are What They Used to Be is a welcome return from everyone's favorite electro-pop underachievers and a surprising testament to Stuart Price's long-lasting virtuosity."

Track listing

Personnel
Credits adapted from liner notes.

Zoot Woman
 Adam Blake
 Johnny Blake
 Stuart Price

Technical personnel
 Tim Young – mastering
 Haberdasherylondon – art direction, design
 Jon Matthews – additional layout
 Matthias Krause – image concept, photography
 Normen Perke – image concept, photography

Charts

References

External links
 
 

2009 albums
Zoot Woman albums
Albums produced by Stuart Price